{{DISPLAYTITLE:Janko group J4}}

In the area of modern algebra known as group theory, the Janko group J4 is a sporadic simple group of order
   22133571132329313743
 = 86775571046077562880
 ≈ 9.

History
J4 is one of the 26 Sporadic groups.  Zvonimir Janko found  J4 in 1975 by studying groups with an involution centralizer of the form 21 + 12.3.(M22:2).  Its existence and uniqueness was shown using computer calculations by Simon P. Norton and others in 1980.   It has a modular representation of dimension 112 over the finite field with 2 elements and is the stabilizer of a certain 4995 dimensional subspace of the exterior square, a fact which Norton used to construct it, and which is the easiest way to deal with it computationally.  and   gave computer-free proofs of uniqueness.  and  gave a computer-free proof of existence by constructing it as an amalgams of groups  210:SL5(2) and (210:24:A8):2 over a group 210:24:A8.

The Schur multiplier and the outer automorphism group are both trivial.

Since  37 and 43 are not supersingular primes, J4 cannot be a subquotient of the monster group. Thus it is one of the 6 sporadic groups called the pariahs.

Representations

The smallest faithful complex representation has dimension 1333; there are two complex conjugate representations of this dimension. The smallest faithful representation over any field is a 112 dimensional representation over the field of 2 elements.

The smallest permutation representation is on 173067389 points, with point stabilizer of the form 211M24. These points can be identified with certain "special vectors" in the 112 dimensional representation.

Presentation

It has a presentation in terms of three generators a, b, and c as

Maximal subgroups
 found the 13 conjugacy classes of maximal subgroups of J4 as follows:

 211:M24 - containing Sylow 2-subgroups and Sylow 3-subgroups; also containing 211:(M22:2), centralizer of involution of class 2B
 21+12.3.(M22:2) - centralizer of involution of class 2A - containing Sylow 2-subgroups and Sylow 3-subgroups
 210:PSL(5,2)
 23+12.(S5 × PSL(3,2)) - containing Sylow 2-subgroups
 U3(11):2
 M22:2
 111+2:(5 × GL(2,3)) - normalizer of Sylow 11-subgroup
 PSL(2,32):5
 PGL(2,23)
 U3(3) - containing Sylow 3-subgroups
 29:28 Frobenius group
 43:14 Frobenius group
 37:12 Frobenius group
A Sylow 3-subgroup is a Heisenberg group: order 27, non-abelian, all non-trivial elements of order 3.

References 

D.J. Benson The simple group J4, PhD Thesis, Cambridge 1981,  https://web.archive.org/web/20110610013308/http://www.maths.abdn.ac.uk/~bensondj/papers/b/benson/the-simple-group-J4.pdf

Ivanov, A. A. The fourth Janko group. Oxford Mathematical Monographs. The Clarendon Press, Oxford University Press, Oxford, 2004. xvi+233 pp.  
Z. Janko, A new finite simple group of order 86,775,570,046,077,562,880 which possesses M24 and the full covering group of M22 as subgroups, J. Algebra 42 (1976) 564-596.  (The title of this paper is incorrect, as the full covering group of M22 was later discovered to be larger: center of order 12, not 6.)

S. P. Norton The construction of J4 in The Santa Cruz conference on finite groups (Ed. Cooperstein, Mason) Amer. Math. Soc 1980.

External links
 MathWorld: Janko Groups
 Atlas of Finite Group Representations: J4 version 2
Atlas of Finite Group Representations: J4 version 3

Sporadic groups